Leptolepia is a genus of ferns in the family Dennstaedtiaceae described as a genus in 1892.

Leptolepia contains only one accepted species, Leptolepia novae-zelandiae, native to New Zealand.

formerly included
Leptolepia maxima (E. Fourn.) C. Chr., syn of Oenotrichia maxima (E.Fourn.) Copel.

Leptolepia novae-zelandiae is commonly known as lace fern. The fronds of the lace fern are widely spaced, intricate and have a similar texture to lace. Lace fern can grow up to 0.75 metres high and a width of 1.5 metres.

References

Leptolepia
Monotypic fern genera
Plants described in 1844